The Lancashire and Cheshire Amateur Football League is an English association football league founded in 1909.  Currently the league consists of six divisions – Premier, One, Two and Three, then A and B.  Historically the divisions named A-D were for Reserve sides of teams in the top four divisions, but 1st teams can now play at the lower levels. From 2022-23, only 2 divisions now have this style of name.  The Premier Division is (as of 2022) at level 14 in the English football league system, below the 3rd levels of the top county leagues in the area: Manchester League, Cheshire League and West Lancashire League.

About the League
The Lancashire and Cheshire Amateur Football League was founded in 1909. The league, as of 2016, is the biggest of the open age Saturday afternoon men's leagues in the region, having eight Saturday divisions in operation, and a few years earlier operated with nine.  Clubs are from the Greater Manchester and northern Cheshire areas. The league is overseen by the local Football Association, the Manchester FA.

The league pioneered the Respect Charter in 2002. When the FA later adopted the Respect programme, the league was a pilot League for this. The launch took place at Chorltonians FC’s Police Club ground, Hough End.

One of the league’s success stories are Stalybridge Celtic, who started off as an amateur football club in the league before turning professional two years later.  As of summer 2022, the most recent teams to move up to the next level are Stretford Paddock, who joined the Cheshire League, Chadderton Cott and De La Salle, who joined the Manchester League for 2022/23.

In 2017, it was a record-breaking season for the Mellor club, who collected a record 5 trophies - the first team winning the Premier Division and the Rhodes Cup, the reserve team the Div 2 title and the Wray Cup, with the club also winning the Aggregate Trophy.

Formation of the League
In 1909, a group of men met and in their own words decided to "Promote an Amateur League of high quality for players who pay to play the genuine sport; also to encourage competition against outside Leagues of similar outlook and standing to the mutual benefit of the amateur game."  These "founding fathers" of the league included W. H. Rhodes, A. H. Downes, R. W. Lambert and E. Roscoe.

The first season
The 1909-10 season saw 11 teams join the league.

The first round of matches took place on Saturday 18 September 1909:

Brooklands v Westinghouse
Bolton Wyresdale v Lymm Amateurs
Werneth Amateurs v Denton Corinthians
Dukinfield Astley v Walkden Amateurs

The league made a profit of £19 17s at the end of the opening season.  The first champions, Walkden Amateurs, finished two points clear of runners-up Stalybridge Celtic.  Third place Bolton Wyresdale were seven points further behind.  The league table ended with 1 game unplayed - Lymm Amateurs v Denton Corinthians.  The league chairman said that Denton Corinthians "had not treated the league in a very good spirit" by not fulfilling the fixture.

After the season, Denton Corinthians disbanded, while Bolton Wyresdale moved on to the Manchester Section of the Lancashire Amateur League.  Two new clubs were accepted for the following season - Nuthurst (Moston) and Manchester Simmarians.  A third club was later accepted - Bolton Caledonians.

The league was said to have been so successful in its initial season, that a second division was to be launched for 1910-11.

Notes

Clubs moving to higher status
A number of clubs that have left the league now play at a higher level.

Notes

Divisional Honours (Formation to 1930s)
The number and naming of the divisions has varied throughout the league's history, and the size of the league has grown from its early days.

A second division (Division Two) was launched including some reserve sides from Division One.

There was no competition 1914/15 to 1919 due to World War One.  The league re-started in 1919 with a single division.

A second division (Division A) was launched with some reserve sides from Division One.

A Junior division was launched for junior players, initially defined as between 14 and 18 and a half, it was later increased up to 20 in 1924.

The Junior Division closed down due to problems clubs had recruiting players under 18.

A new Division Two was launched in place of Division A.  Therefore Division A would now effectively become the division for Reserves.

A new Junior Division was launched, and at least eight players had to be under 18.5, with up to 3 open-age players allowed.  A second Reserve division "B" was also launched.

The Junior and B divisions were dropped after one season.

Division B was re-introduced.

Notes

Recent Champions

The league champions for the Top 4 divisions in recent seasons are:

2022-23 League Teams

Below are the teams that started the 2022-23 season.

References

External links
Official league website
L&C FA Full-Time website

Football league systems in England
Lancashire
Cheshire